Michael Lee Grace (born June 14, 1956 in Pontiac, Michigan) is a former Major League Baseball player.

External links
, or Retrosheet
Pura Pelota (Venezuelan Winter League)

1956 births
Living people
Baseball players from Michigan
Billings Mustangs players
Cincinnati Reds players
Columbus Astros players
Indianapolis Indians players
Major League Baseball third basemen
Navegantes del Magallanes players
American expatriate baseball players in Venezuela
Sportspeople from Pontiac, Michigan
Savannah Braves players
Tampa Tarpons (1957–1987) players
Trois-Rivières Aigles players